Statistics of Ekstraklasa for the 2001–02 season.

Overview
16 teams competed in the 2001–02 season. Legia Warsaw won the championship.

First phase

Group A

Results

Group B

Results

Final phase

Championship group

Results

Relegation group

Results

Relegation playoffs
The matches were played on 8 and 12 May 2002.

Top goalscorers

References

Ekstraklasa seasons
Poland
1